Golabad (also Romanized as Golābād; also known as Kūlavān, Kulavar, and Kyulava) is a village in Mishu-e Jonubi Rural District, Sufian District, Shabestar County, East Azerbaijan Province, Iran. At the 2006 census, its population was 766, in 186 families.

References 

Populated places in Shabestar County